The Paycheck Protection Program (PPP) is a $953-billion business loan program established by the United States federal government during the Donald Trump administration in 2020 through the Coronavirus Aid, Relief, and Economic Security Act (CARES Act) to help certain businesses, self-employed workers, sole proprietors, certain nonprofit organizations, and tribal businesses continue paying their workers.

The Paycheck Protection Program allows entities to apply for low-interest private loans to pay for their payroll and certain other costs. The amount of a PPP loan is approximately equal to 2.5 times the applicant's average monthly payroll costs. In some cases, an applicant may receive a second draw typically equal to the first. The loan proceeds may be used to cover payroll costs, rent, interest, and utilities. The loan may be partially or fully forgiven if the business keeps its employee counts and employee wages stable. The program is implemented by the U.S. Small Business Administration. The deadline to apply for a PPP loan was March 31, 2021.

Some economists have found that the PPP did not save as many jobs as purported and aided too many businesses that were not at risk of going under. They noted that other programs, such as unemployment insurance, food assistance, and aid to state and local governments, would have been more efficient at strengthening the economy. The program was criticized for its exorbitant cost, costing approximately $169k - $258k per job saved, and that the majority of benefits flowed to small-business owners, their creditors and their suppliers rather than to workers.Supporters of the program note that the PPP functioned well to prevent business closures and cannot be measured on the number of jobs saved alone.

Overview
The purpose of the Paycheck Protection Program and loan forgiveness is to provide economic relief to small businesses and certain other entities that have been adversely impacted by the COVID-19 pandemic.

According to a 2022 study, the PPP:cumulatively preserved between 2 and 3 million job-years of employment over 14 months at a cost of $169K to $258K per job-year retained. These numbers imply that only 23 to 34 percent of PPP dollars went directly to workers who would otherwise have lost jobs; the balance flowed to business owners and shareholders, including creditors and suppliers of PPP-receiving firms. Program incidence was ultimately highly regressive, with about three-quarters of PPP funds accruing to the top quintile of households. PPP's breakneck scale-up, its high cost per job saved, and its regressive incidence have a common origin: PPP was essentially untargeted because the United States lacked the administrative infrastructure to do otherwise. Harnessing modern administrative systems, other high-income countries were able to better target pandemic business aid to firms in financial distress. Building similar capacity in the U.S. would enable improved targeting when the next pandemic or other large-scale economic emergency inevitably arises.

Provisions

Eligibility

In order to be eligible for the Paycheck Protection Program, an applicant must be a small business, sole proprietor, independent contractor, self-employed person, 501(c)(3) nonprofit organization, 501(c)(19) veterans organization, or a tribal business.

Applicants who operate as a sole proprietorship, an independent contractor, or an eligible self-employed individual must have been in operation on February 15, 2020. Other types of applicants must have been in operation on February 15, 2020, and must have either had paid employees or paid independent contractors.

The applicant and its affiliates must also:
 Have 500 or fewer employees worldwide, including its U.S. and foreign affiliates; or 
 Meet the Small Business Administration's industry size standards based on average number of employees. or
 Have a tangible net worth that did not exceed $15million on March 27, 2020, and an average net income that did not exceed $5million for the two full fiscal years prior the date of the PPP application.

The applicant must be located in the United States or its possessions. The applicant's primary operations must be located in the United States or its possessions or, alternatively, the applicant's business must make a significant contribution to the economy of the United States.

An applicant is ineligible for a PPP loan if:

 It engaged in any activity that is illegal under federal, state, or local law; or
 It is a household employer, such as an individual employing nannies, housekeepers, or other household employees; or
 It is a passive business, such as a hedge fund or a private equity firm; or
 It is in bankruptcy proceedings at the time of application or before the loan proceeds are disbursed; or
 It is a public hospital that receives 50% or more of its funding from state- or local-government sources, excluding Medicaid; or
 An owner of 20% or more of the business is incarcerated; or
 An owner of 20% or more of the business is presently subject to an indictment, criminal information, arraignment, or other means by which formal criminal charges for felony offenses are brought in any jurisdiction; or has been convicted of a felony within the last year; or 
 An owner of 20% or more of the business is on either probation or parole, which began within the last five years for a felony involving fraud, bribery, embezzlement, or a false statement in a loan application or an application for federal financial assistance, and within the last one year for other felonies; or 
 The applicant, the business's owners, or any business owned or controlled by the applicant or the business's owners have ever obtained a direct or guaranteed loan from any federal agency that is currently delinquent or has defaulted within the last seven years and caused a loss to the federal government; or
 The business is owned in whole or in part by an undocumented alien.

An applicant is not required to demonstrate that it cannot find credit elsewhere, but it is required to certify, in good faith, that "current economic uncertainty makes this loan request necessary to support the ongoing operations of the applicant".

Each business may receive one PPP loan with up to two draws.

Loan amount
The amount of the PPP loan is based on the applicant's payroll costs.

Payroll costs include salaries, wages, commissions, cash tips, paid leave, severance pay, clergy parsonage and housing allowance, and other compensation paid to employees. These costs are limited to $100,000 annualized per employee. Payroll costs also include group health benefits and insurance and retirement benefits. Payroll costs include taxes withheld from employees' wages and all state and local taxes assessed on compensation, but payroll costs do not include the employer's portion of social security tax, the employer's portion of Medicare tax, and federal unemployment tax. In the case of a sole proprietor, independent contractor, or self-employed person, payroll costs include net profits from self-employment, based on the 2019 Form 1040 Schedule C line 31, and limited to $100,000 annualized.

Payroll costs do not include payments to workers whose primary residence is outside the United States. Payroll costs also do not include payments to non-employees of the applicant.

In order to calculate the amount of the PPP loan, the applicant calculates its payroll costs between January 1, 2019, and December 31, 2019. Average monthly payroll costs are calculated by dividing this amount by 12.

The PPP loan amount is equal to 2.5 times the average monthly payroll costs. For applicants with an Economic Injury Disaster Loan (EIDL) made between January 31, 2020, and April 3, 2020, the PPP loan amount could be increased by the outstanding amount of the EIDL, less any advance received under an EIDL COVID-19.

Each PPP loan may not exceed $10million. In some cases, however, each affiliate of a company is allowed to apply and receive its own PPP loan. On April 24, NBC reported that there were at least eight cases where a company and its affiliates had received PPP loans, and half of them had received more than $20 million in total.

A borrower that accidentally made an error in its PPP loan application that resulted in larger PPP loan amount must take actions to correct the error.

Application process
An applicant applies for a PPP loan directly with an eligible private lender, such as a federally insured bank, a federally insured credit union, Farm Credit System institution, or a Small Business Administration-approved lender.

The Small Business Administration has a standard application form, although private lenders were allowed to use their own paper forms or electronic forms if they were substantially similar to the standard form. An applicant has to attach documentation to support the amount of the loan applied for, such as payroll reports, payroll tax filings, Form 1099-MISC, or a sole proprietor's income and expenses. If these records were unavailable, a lender could accept bank records if they sufficiently demonstrate the qualifying amount.

Applicants must make certain assertions, including that "current economic uncertainty makes this loan request necessary to support the ongoing operations of the applicant". While a lender does not need to require a business to demonstrate the basis its certification, the Small Business Administration may do so. The Small Business Administration does not believe that a publicly traded business with substantial market value and access to capital markets could make that certification in good faith. An applicant that, together with its affiliates, receives PPP loans totaling $2million or more should retain documentation of what basis it made this certification.

Applying for a PPP loan is free to the applicant. An applicant was not charged any application fees by either the private lender or the federal government. The Small Business Administration compensates lenders for processing PPP loans. Certified Public Accountants and accounting firms are not allowed to charge businesses to prepare their applications for PPP loans; instead, the lender is permitted to, and may, compensate them directly. Nevertheless, an accounting firm is allowed to charge a business for providing advice on deciding which loan program and tax relief program would be best for their business.

Some lenders only accept PPP applications from businesses that already have a depository account at the lender.

Loan applications are only accepted, and loans may only be made, through August 8, 2020.

Making a false statement to obtain a PPP loan is a crime subject to possible imprisonment, fines, or both.

Applications for PPP loans are accepted, approved, and disbursed in the order of first-come first-served, until the entire amount appropriated by Congress is depleted. The first appropriation of $349billion was depleted on April 16, 2020, and the Small Business Administration stopped accepting new applications from lenders as of that date. A bill to add $320billion of funding was passed by the Senate and the House of Representatives on April 21 and April 23, respectively, and signed into law by President Trump on April 24, and the Small Business Administration began accepting new applications from lenders on April 27.

The Equal Credit Opportunity Act requires lenders to notify an applicant of a decision on the PPP loan application within 30 days of the date the lender receives either a loan number or a response about the availability of funds from the Small Business Administration.

If a PPP loan application is incomplete, the Equal Credit Opportunity Act requires the lender to notify the applicant of the issue, and the lender must provide the applicant a period of time to make the application complete. A lender is allowed to deny an incomplete application only if the applicant does not make the application complete by the end of the time period provided by the lender. A lender is not allowed to deny a PPP loan application solely because the lender has not yet received a response from the Small Business Administration.

If a lender denies a PPP loan application, the Equal Credit Opportunity Act requires the lender to provide an adverse action notice to the applicant with specific reasons for the denial, even if the application is denied before sending the application to the Small Business Administration.

Loan terms
The bill extends the deferral of principal and interest payments to the date that loan forgiveness is remitted to the lender or, if the borrower does not apply for loan forgiveness, ten months after the end of the covered period.

A business is not required to begin to pay any principal or interest to the lender until the date that the Small Business Administration disburses the amount of loan forgiveness to the lender. If the business does not apply for loan forgiveness, then the business is not required to begin to pay principal or interest to the lender until ten months plus 24 weeks after the date the loan proceeds were disbursed to the business.

For PPP loans that the Small Business Administration approved on or after June 5, the PPP loan must have a maturity of at least five years. For other PPP loans, the PPP loan has a maturity of two years; each lender has the option to extend the maturity of these PPP loans longer.

PPP loans have an interest rate of 1 percent.

Each PPP loan is guaranteed by the U.S. Small Business Administration. An applicant need not provide any collateral or personal guarantees in order to apply or be approved for a PPP loan. A PPP loan is a non-recourse loan, unless the loan proceeds are used for unallowable purposes.

Allowable use of loan proceeds
PPP loan proceeds may generally be used for payroll costs. Payroll costs include gross salary and wages, tips, vacation leave, sick leave, holiday pay, furlough pay, bonuses, severance pay, and other compensation paid to employees, up to $46,154 per employee. Payroll costs also include the employer's cost for health insurance benefits for its employees and retirement benefits for its employees, neither of which are counted against the $46,154 limit per employee. Employer-paid state taxes assessed on employee compensation, such as state unemployment tax, are allowable payroll costs. Emergency Paid Sick Leave and Emergency Family Medical Leave, the employer's portion of social security and Medicare taxes, and federal unemployment tax must be excluded from payroll costs.

In the case of a sole proprietor, independent contractor, or self-employed person, allowable payroll costs include owner-compensation replacement, up to 15.38% of their net self-employment profit in 2019, up to a maximum of $20,833. Health insurance benefits and retirement benefits for an owner of the business are not allowable payroll costs.

PPP loan proceeds may also be used for certain non-payroll costs. Allowable non-payroll costs include business payments of mortgage interest, other interest, rent, and utilities, such as electricity, gas, water, telephone, internet, and transportation utility fees assessed by state and local governments.

PPP loan proceeds cannot be used to compensate outside independent contractors that provide services to the business, nor to compensate employees whose primary residence is not in the United States.

If the business operates internationally, PPP loan proceeds must only be used for the benefit of its operations in the United States and its possessions.

Loan forgiveness

Calculation for borrowers with employees
The principal of a PPP loan will be either partially or fully forgiven under certain circumstances. A business may apply for loan forgiveness at any time on or before the maturity date of the loan, including before the covered period ends in the case of a business that has expended all of the PPP loan proceeds for which forgiveness is requested.

PPP loan forgiveness is generally based on what the loan proceeds were spent on, to what extent the business maintained or rehired its employees, and to what extent it maintained the wages and hours of its employees.

 Take the business's average number of full-time equivalent (FTE) employees per month during the 24 weeks after the loan proceeds were disbursed, and divide it by the average number of FTEs per month between February 15, 2019, and December 31, 2019.
 Multiply the above by the total amount paid for payroll costs, mortgage interest, rent, and utilities during the 24 weeks after the loan proceeds were disbursed.
 If, during the 24 weeks of the loan, the business reduced any employee's wages by more than 25% when compared to the previous calendar quarter, reduce the above amount by the amount of the reduction in wages.

One FTE is equal one worker who worked at least 40 hours per week. FTE for someone who worked fewer than 40 hours per week is equal to the number of hours worked per week divided by 40. Alternatively, the business may choose to consider each and every worker who worked fewer than 40 hours per week to be 0.5 FTE each.

In an exception to the above, the business will not be required to reduce its PPP loan forgiveness due to a wage reductions or a decrease in FTEs in the following cases.
 The business received a PPP loan of $50,000 or less. 
 The business made a good-faith, written offer to rehire a particular employee during the 24-week period, and the employee declined the offer. 
 An employee was fired for cause, voluntarily resigned, or voluntarily requested and received a reduction in work hours.
 The business rehired employees by December 31. 
 The business restored wage or hour reductions by December 31. 
 The business was unable to rehire its employees on February 15 and was also unable to hire similarly qualified employees by December 31. 
 The business is unable to return to its previous level of business activity due to compliance with requirements or guidance from the Department of Health and Human Services, the Centers for Disease Control and Prevention, or the Occupational Safety and Health Administration between March 1 and December 31, involving COVID-19-related standards for worker safety or customer safety.

A business can receive loan forgiveness on all of its payroll costs. Additionally, it may receive forgiveness for an amount of non-payroll costs up to 66.67% of the amount it spent on payroll costs. The total amount of loan forgiveness cannot exceed the total amount of the PPP loan. The amount of loan proceeds used for unallowable purposes is ineligible for forgiveness. Knowingly using loan proceeds for unallowable purposes is fraud.

Calculation for self-employed individuals and owner-employees

If the PPP loan was made before June 5, 2020, and the borrower chooses to use an 8-week covered period, then the maximum amount of loan forgiveness for compensation for self-employed individuals and owner-employees is equal to the lesser of 15.38% of their 2019 compensation or $15,385 per individual in total across all businesses. For other borrowers who are self-employed or are owner-employees, the maximum amount of loan forgiveness for compensation for self-employed individuals and owner-employees is the lesser of 20.83% of 2019 compensation or $20,833 per individual in total across all businesses.

If the individual files a Form 1040 Schedule C or Schedule F, then the maximum is further limited to the amount of their 2019 net profit on their Schedule C or Schedule F.

In the case of a general partner, the maximum is further limited to the amount of their 2019 net earnings from self-employment, less claimed section 179 depreciation deduction, unreimbursed partnership expenses, and depletion from oil and gas properties, and then multiplied by 92.35%.

In the case of a self-employed individual, including a filer of either Form 1040 Schedule C or Schedule F and general partners, they cannot claim loan forgiveness for retirement contributions and health insurance contributions separately because these costs are already included in their net self-employment income. If the borrower is a self-employed individual, additional loan forgiveness is not allowed for rent or mortgage interest.

The compensation of an owner-employee of at least 5% of the C corporation is allowable and limited to the amount of their 2019 employee cash compensation, employer retirement contributions on their behalf, and health insurance contributions on their behalf. For each of these owner-employees, health insurance benefits and retirement contributions are allowable costs and do not count against the maximum amount of loan forgiveness for compensation above.

For an owner-employee that owns more than 5% of either an S corporation or a C corporation, retirement plan contributions attributed to the owner are allowable and count toward PPP loan forgiveness, up to 20.833% of the owner's retirement plan contribution amount in 2019.

The compensation of an owner-employee of an S corporation is limited to the amount of their 2019 cash compensation and employer retirement contributions on their behalf, but it cannot separately include health insurance contributions made on their behalf because these contributions are already included in their cash compensation. For an owner-employee of a S corporation, health insurance benefits and retirement contributions are allowable costs but do count against the maximum amount of loan forgiveness for compensation above.

The above owner-employee compensation limits do not apply if the individual owns less than 5% of the S corporation or C corporation. In that case,  owner-employee compensation are treated the same as any non-owner employee's compensation, and qualifies for PPP loan forgiveness for up to $46,154 of compensation for a 24-week covered period as well as additional amounts for retirement plan expenses, health benefits paid for the owner-employee and their family, and state unemployment taxes on their compensation.

Application process
The business may use one of three PPP loan forgiveness applications, depending on their situation. The business completes the PPP loan forgiveness application and gives it to the lender along with any required documentation.

At that point, the lender has 60 days to send a decision and a request for payment to the Small Business Administration. When the lender does so, the Small Business Administration has 90 days to remit the appropriate forgiveness amount to the lender, including accrued interest on that amount, subject to Small Business Administration's review of the loan or the loan application. The business must then pay any remaining principal and accrued interest to the lender by the end of the maturity of the PPP loan.

If the Small Business Administration determines that a business that received a PPP loan was ineligible for the PPP loan, the Small Business Administration may have recourse against individual shareholders, members, or partners of the business for non-payment of the PPP loan, and the lender will be required to repay the processing fee it had received from the Small Business Administration. A business will be able to seek reconsideration and appeal of the Small Business Administration's decisions.

For those businesses that received PPP loans early in the process, eligibility for applying for loan forgiveness began as early as May 27, 2020, eight weeks after the first distributions of PPP loan proceeds.

On August 4, 2020, the Small Business Administration issued guidance to clarify the process for lenders to review forgiveness applications. The guidance addressed issues regarding the submission process; employee, independent contractor and sole proprietor compensation; non-payroll costs and payroll cycle calculations.  Borrowers may use scanned copies of paperwork in lieu of in-person meetings with lenders.

Record retention
Each business must keep documentation related to the PPP loan for a minimum of six years after the date its PPP loan is forgiven or the date the PPP loan is paid in full, whichever is later. The business must send the documentation to the Small Business Administration and its inspector general upon request. The Small Business Administration and its inspector general may review any PPP loan.

Income taxes
Ordinarily, loan forgiveness is considered taxable income, but forgiveness of a PPP loan is not considered taxable income. A business may take a tax-deduction for business expenses that resulted in loan forgiveness.

Appeal process
A business may appeal the Small Business Administration's official written decisions regarding PPP loans and PPP loan forgiveness. Decisions made by a private lenders may not be appealed. A lender may not appeal the Small Business Administration's decisions. A business must file a petition to appeal with the Office of Hearings and Appeals by 30 days after a borrower's receipt of the Small Business Administration's final PPP loan review decision or 30 days after the lender notifies the business of the Small Business Administration's final PPP loan decision, whichever is earlier.

During the appeal, the business should demonstrate that there was a clear error based on evidence. An administrative law judge or an administrative judge will decide whether there was a clear error of fact or law.

The judge may affirm the Small Business Administration's decision, deny the Small Business Administration's decision, or remand the matter back to the Small Business Administration for additional consideration. A judge will not reverse a decision by the Small Business Administration entirely because a different decision could have been made. The judge will generally make a decision within 45 calendar days. The judge's decision will generally be made publicly available unless the judge places a protective order or the Small Business Administration approves the business's request to redact certain information.

A business may challenge a judge's decision within 10 days of receipt of the judge's initial decision. A business may also request a review by the Small Business Administration within 30 days of receipt of the decision. After exhausting administrative remedies, a business may request judicial review in federal district court of the Small Business Administration's final decision.

The business must pay any attorney fees that it incurs related to the appeal process.

Second draws
Under certain circumstances, a business that received a PPP loan is allowed to receive additional loan proceeds by way of a second draw.

An entity is eligible for a second draw if all of the following are true.
 It must have received a first draw PPP loan, and it must have either fully spent the entire proceeds of the first draw or applied for forgiveness of the first draw.
 It must have fewer than 300 employees.
 It must also have had at least a 25% decrease in revenue for a calendar quarter in 2020 when compared to the corresponding calendar quarter in 2019. 
 It must not have received a Shuttered Venue Operators grant.
 It must not be publicly-traded.
 It must not be primarily engaged in political activities, lobbying activities, promoting or participating in a political campaign, public policy advocacy, or political strategy, or that publicly describes itself as a think tank.
 It must not be a 501(c)(6) professional sports league.
 It must not have 20% or more of its economic interests owned by an entity created in or organized under the laws of the People's Republic of China or Hong Kong, does not have significant operations in either of those locations, and does not have a board member who is a resident of the People's Republic of China.
 If applying for a second draw loan exceeding $150,000, it must have already sent a completed loan forgiveness application to the lender.

The amount of the second draw is equal to 2.5 times its average monthly payroll costs during 2019. Alternatively, the business may elect to calculate the second draw based on the average monthly payroll costs of any 12-month period ending prior to the date of the loan. Businesses in the lodging or food accommodations industries may multiply their average monthly payroll costs by 3.5 rather than 2.5. In no case may a second draw exceed $2million.

Second draw PPP loans generally have the same terms as the first draw PPP loans.

The deadline to apply was March 31, 2021.

Legislative history

CARES Act 

The Paycheck Protection Program was enacted as part of the Coronavirus Aid, Relief, and Economic Security Act (CARES Act).  All of the Paycheck Protection Program's original $349billion was allocated between April 3 and April 16, 2020. The Small Business Administration stopped accepting new PPP applications on April 16, 2020. $342.3billion was for PPP loans, and $6.7billion was for lender reimbursements for processing loan applications that were approved.  Between April 3 and April 16, 2020, there were 1.7million loans made, and 4,975 lenders approved loans. The average loan amount was $206,000. Of all loans, 74 percent were for $150,000 or less. Businesses in the construction industry received 13.12 percent of the total of loan amounts, the largest percentage of any classification. The next four highest classifications were professional, scientific, and technical services with 12.65 percent; manufacturing with 11.96 percent; health care and social assistance with 11.65 percent; and accommodation and food services with 8.91 percent.

Paycheck Protection Program and Health Care Enhancement Act 

On April 21 and 23, respectively, the Senate and House passed the Paycheck Protection Program and Health Care Enhancement Act to add $320billion of funding to the PPP. President Trump signed the bill into law on April 24, 2020, which allowed the Small Business Administration to accept applications again on April 27.

Paycheck Protection Program Flexibility Act of 2020 
The Paycheck Protection Program Flexibility Act of 2020 amended the Paycheck Protection Program. Loan forgiveness was expanded from eight weeks of eligible costs to the 24 weeks or December 31, 2020, whichever is earlier; alternatively, a business whose PPP loan was made before June 5 may opt to use the eight-week period instead. PPP loans made on or after June 5 must have a minimum term of five years, rather than two years. At least 60% of the loan forgiveness amount must be for payroll costs, rather than 75%. The safe harbor provision that loan forgiveness will not decrease if the business rehires employees and restores wage reductions by June 30 is extended to December 31. Loan forgiveness will not decrease if the business was unable to rehire its employees on February 15 and is unable to hire similarly qualified employees by December 31. Loan forgiveness will not decrease if the business is unable to return to its previous level of business activity due to compliance with requirements or guidance from the Department of Health and Human Services, the Centers for Disease Control, or the Occupational Safety and Health Administration between March 1 and December 31, involving COVID-19-related standards for worker safety or customer safety. The deferral of principal and interest payments was extended to the date that loan forgiveness is remitted to the lender or, if the borrower does not apply for loan forgiveness, ten months after the end of the covered period. Employer payroll tax deferral is allowed even after loan forgiveness is approved. PPP loan proceeds are required to be spent only on allowable costs during the eight- or 24-week covered period. Rep. Dean Phillips (D MN) introduced the bill on May 26. The House of Representatives passed the bill by a vote of 417–1 on May 28. The Senate passed the bill by voice vote on June 3. President Trump signed the bill into law on June 5, 2020.

Deadline extension 
On July 4, 2020,  was passed, extending the application deadline from June 30 to August 8, 2020.

It was introduced on June 30 by Sen. Benjamin Cardin (D–MD), and the Senate unanimously passed it. The House of Representatives passed the bill by unanimous consent the following day. President Trump signed the bill into law on July 3. As of June 27, $519billion had been allocated to PPP loans, and $140billion remained available.

On March 30, 2021, President Biden signed a bill to extend the deadline to apply for a PPP loan to May 31, 2021. The bill also stated that the Small Business Administration would have 30 days from the application deadline to process PPP loan applications. As of March 30, 2021, $82billion of unallocated funds remained.

Proposed amendments 
Rep. Pramila Jayapal (D–WA) proposed the Paycheck Guarantee Act. Rather than having businesses take a private loan that may be forgiven after the fact under certain circumstances, the Treasury Department would reimburse businesses for employee salaries and benefits for three months or until consumer demand increases.

Rep. Nita Lowey (D–NY) introduced the Heroes Act, which would extend the period that PPP loans can be made from June 30 to December 31, 2020. It would expand loan forgiveness from eight weeks of eligible costs to the 24 weeks or December 31, 2020, whichever is earlier. The bill would include eligible interest costs in the debt forgiveness calculation. It would lift the requirement that at least 75% of the loan forgiveness amount must be for payroll costs. Employers would be allowed to use PPP loan proceeds for personal protective equipment and other safety items for its employees, and those costs would be part of loan forgiveness. Each local television, radio, and newspaper company would be eligible to apply separately, rather than together as an affiliated group, if they are otherwise eligible. It would expand eligibility from 501(c)(3) and 501(c)(19) nonprofit organizations to all nonprofit organizations that are tax-exempt under Section 501(c), although certain politically active 501(c)(4) organizations would be ineligible and compensation of registered lobbyist employees would not be allowable payroll costs. PPP loans would have a minimum term of five years, rather than two years, allowing businesses additional time to repay the loan. It would make a business ineligible for a PPP loan if an owners has been convicted of a felony of financial fraud or deception within the previous five years. The bill was passed by the House of Representatives in a vote of 208–199.

The Prioritized Paycheck Protection Program Act would allow some businesses to be eligible for a second PPP loan. Eligibility would be limited to self-employed individuals and businesses with 100 or fewer employees, and who have experienced a greater than a 50% decrease in revenue compared to recent quarter. Publicly traded companies would not be eligible for a second PPP loan. Businesses with multiple locations that are in the hospitality and lodging industries would have a limit of $2million for all locations. A portion of the appropriation would be for businesses with fewer than 10 employees and businesses in underserved and rural communities. On June 18, Sens. Benjamin Cardin (D–MD),  Chris Coons (D–DE), and Jeanne Shaheen (D–NH) introduced the Prioritized Paycheck Protection Program Act in the Senate, and Reps. Angie Craig (D–MN) and Antonio Delgado (D–NY) introduced the bill in the House of Representatives.

In June 2020, U.S. Senators Rob Portman (R–OH), Ben Cardin (D–MD), James Lankford (R–OK), and Cory Booker (D–NJ) introduced the PPP Second Chance Act to allow people with criminal records to apply for PPP loans for their small businesses. Under existing PPP rules, the business owner cannot have been convicted of a felony within the past year.

Senators Marco Rubio (R–FL) and Susan Collins (R–ME) introduced the Continuing Small Business Recovery and Paycheck Protection Program Act on July 27. Under the Act, a business would be eligible for another PPP loan under certain circumstances. The business would need to demonstrate that it experienced at least a 50% decrease in gross receipts either between January 1 and March 31 or between April 1 and June 30, 2020, compared to the same days in 2019. The borrower would need to employ no more than 300 employees or meet certain alternative size standards. The second PPP loan would be limited to $2,000,000, and the total amount of PPP and other SBA loans received could not exceed $10,000,000 during the previous 90 days. Publicly traded businesses and businesses incorporated in, affiliated with, or with certain ties to the People’s Republic of China would not be eligible for a second PPP loan. Businesses in bankruptcy would be eligible only under certain circumstances. For each new PPP loan, the Small Business Administration would pay each lender an amount equal to 3 percent of the first $350,000 plus 1% of the amount exceeding $350,000. Businesses with PPP loans of less than $150,000 would be able to attest to compliance with PPP loan regulations in order to receive full loan forgiveness. Other businesses that receive PPP loans of up to $2,000,000 would be able to apply for loan forgiveness by certifying they have documentation of their forgiveness eligibility and will retain them for three years after the applying for loan forgiveness. All businesses would be able to use existing and new PPP loan proceeds for software, cloud computing costs, human resources costs, and accounting costs; out-of-pocket costs from property damage related to public disturbances in 2020; supplies that are essential to the business's operations and purchased based on contract made before February 15, 2020; personal protective equipment and other costs so the business can adhere to the federal government's health and safety recommendations for the coronavirus issued between March 1 and December 31, 2020. In addition, all group insurance costs would be considered eligible payroll costs. It would also expand eligibility for PPP loans to 501(c)(6) nonprofit organizations and destination marketing organizations that employ 300 or fewer employees, that do not receive more than 10 percent of its revenue from lobbying activities, whose lobbying activities do not consist of more than 10 percent of its activities overall, that is not a professional football league, and whose purpose is not to promote or participate in political campaigns. The Act would require a business to disclose to the Small Business Administration if a controlling interest in the business is held by the President, the Vice President, an Executive department head, a member of Congress, or their families. The Act would also appropriate an additional $190billion for PPP loans.

Consolidated Appropriations Act, 2021 

On December 21, 2020, the House and the Senate passed the Consolidated Appropriations Act, 2021, which includes $284 billion in forgivable loans to small businesses via the Paycheck Protection Program.

The Act restarted the period to apply for PPP loans, added $284.5billion in funding for PPP loans, and it allowed certain entities to apply for a second draw of a PPP loan. The Act also opened eligibility to certain 501(c)(6) nonprofit organizations.

The Act also added to the types of allowable expenses of PPP loan proceeds. Allowable expenses now include operating expenses, defined as business software or cloud-computing service that helps business operations; product delivery; service delivery; payroll; human resources; sales; billing; or accounting or tracking of supplies, inventory, records, and expenses. Allowable expenses also include out-of-pocket costs from property damage, vandalism, or looting resulting from public disturbances that occurred in 2020 that were not otherwise covered from other sources. Allowable expenses also include expenses to protect workers, such as air-pressure ventilation systems, filtration systems, physical barriers to ensure social distancing, a drive-through window, an expansion of business space, health screening, the purchase of personal protective equipment, or any other expenditures to adapt the entities' activities in order to comply with government-issued COVID-19 safety guidelines. Allowable expenses also include the cost of essential supplies for its operating activities, made pursuant to a contract in effect prior to the beginning of the loan period.

The Act stated that entities that received a PPP loan of less than $150,000, rather than $50,000, would be eligible to use a simplified one-page loan forgiveness application.

The Act expanded the definition of allowable payroll costs to employer-sponsored group life insurance benefits, group disability insurance benefits, group vision insurance benefits, and group dental insurance benefits.

PPP Extension Act of 2021 
On March 11, 2021, the bill,  PPP Extension Act of 2021, was introduced in House of Representatives during the 117th Congress. The bill extends the covered period of the Paycheck Protection Program from March 31, 2021, to June 30, 2021, by amending the Small Business Act and CARES Act. It passed the House on March 16, 2021, in a bipartisan vote (415–3). It passed the Senate on March 25, 2021, in an also bipartisan vote (92–7). The following day on March 26, it was signed into law by President Joe Biden.

Criticism of recipients
By June, 4.5 million businesses had received over $500 billion of taxpayer money, but the exact identities of the recipients were unknown, as Steve Mnuchin said that this was "proprietary" and "confidential." Additionally, although the Government Accountability Office had requested information about the loans for oversight purposes, the Small Business Administration was withholding the information.

On June 11, Treasury Secretary Steve Mnuchin told the Senate Committee on Small Business and Entrepreneurship that PPP loan recipients' names and loan amounts were confidential and would not be publicly released. Eight days later, the Small Business Administration and the Department of the Treasury said that it would release the names, addresses, and other information about recipients of PPP loans exceeding $150,000 each. Each recipient would be listed with a dollar range of the loan amount. PPP loans of $150,000 and less would be disclosed in the aggregate. On July 6, the Department of Treasury posted the data to its web site.

A lawsuit was filed by several press organizations within the United States District Court for the District of Columbia in May 2020 seeking exact details of the PPP loan applicants beyond the information posted by the Small Business Administration. In November 2020, Judge James E. Boasberg ordered a preliminary injunction in favor of the press, requiring the SBA to publish the full names, addresses, and precise loan amounts of the PPP recipients by November 19, 2020. The data was released to the public on December 1, 2020. According to data from November 2020, 87 percent of PPP loans were for less than $150,000.

Racial disparities have been reported among recipients. In July 2020, a National Geographic article, citing the Center for Responsible Lending, reported that 95% of Black-owned businesses and 91% of Latino-owned businesses were unlikely to receive loans because they were very small businesses with few employees and because they did not have existing relationships with banks. The article also said that 41% of Black-owned businesses had already closed permanently while only 17 percent of white-owned businesses met this fate.

At least 100 PPP loans were made to businesses without business names.

Loans made to politicians and their families 
Some PPP loans were received by businesses owned or run by members of Congress or their spouses. On June 16, Politico reported that this included Reps. Susie Lee (D–NV), Debbie Mucarsel-Powell (D–FL), Roger Williams (R–TX), and Vicky Hartzler (R–MO).  Three weeks prior, Dean Phillips (D–MN) had introduced legislation to require public release of the name of many of the recipients of PPP loans, but enough Republicans voted against it that the bill did not pass. Lee and Muarsel-Powell had voted in favor of public disclosures while Williams and Hartzler had voted against public disclosures. Ordinarily, an application for a Small Business Administration by a business owned or run by a member of Congress or their immediate family must be reviewed by the Standards of Conduct Commissions before the loan may be approved, but the Small Business Administration had waived that requirement for all PPP loans on April 13.

Rep. Ayanna Pressley (D-MA) reported receiving PPP loans in her 2020 Financial Disclosure Report.

The parents of White House Press Secretary Kayleigh McEnany received $1–2 million for their business, McEnany Roofing, which has 141 employees. The press secretary told Fox News in April 2020 that most loans had gone to "companies with 10 or fewer employees. That is what this program is designed to do, that is who it is helping.”

Businesses with addresses at properties owned by President Trump and advisor Jared Kushner received at least 25 PPP loans totaling over $3.65million. Of these businesses, 15 reported having no more than one employee each, or they did not self-report how many employees they had. Triomphe Restaurant Corp., at the Trump International Hotel and Tower in New York City, received a PPP loan of $2,164,543, and it reported having zero employees. The business later closed.

Loans made to churches 
LifeWay Christian Resources surveyed Protestant pastors and found that 40% said their church had applied for government assistance through the CARES Act or through the Small Business Administration, and, of those who applied, 59% said they had been approved. The Diocesan Fiscal Management Conference estimated that 9,000 Catholic parishes had received PPP loans, roughly half of the Catholic parishes in the country. Jon Costas wrote in Christianity Today that churches should consider the "socio-economic and social justice issues" of applying for PPP loans, and whether following the rules for the loan proceeds are consistent with religious texts. Through June 30, 2020, over 88,000 loans totaling $7.3 billion were approved to churches. At least 60 churches in Texas received over $1 million each. They included Lakewood Church, a Houston megachurch led by televangelist Joel Osteen, which received $4.4 million; the Archdiocese of Galveston-Houston, which received about $4 million; and the Catholic Charities of the Archdiocese, which received about $4.5 million. A Florida-based company called ASLAN International Ministry received $8.4 million; it appeared that the company never did anything religious, and it was subsequently revealed as no longer maintaining a website nor a physical address.

Loans made to anti-vaccination organizations

A total of $850,000 in loans was granted to some of the country's most prominent anti-vaccination groups. While vaccines are generally considered safe and effective, these groups have been spreading misinformation and conspiracy theories that increase vaccine hesitancy, especially in the context on COVID-19.

The Center for Countering Digital Hate identified PPP loans made to the National Vaccine Information Center, to Joseph Mercola's online business group, to the Informed Consent Action Network, as well as to Robert F. Kennedy Jr.'s Children's Health Defense.

The Tenpenny Integrative Medical Center, which is the osteopathy clinic of anti-vaccination activist Sherri Tenpenny, received a $72,000 loan.

Loans made to publicly traded companies
Between April 3 and April 14, PPP loans included at least 94 loans made to publicly traded companies or their subsidiaries, totaling $365million.

On April 23, the Small Business Administration released guidance stating that it is unlikely that a publicly traded business with substantial market value and access to capital markets would be eligible for a PPP loan. Such a business would not be able to certify in good faith that the PPP loan is necessary to support its ongoing operations because of the current economic uncertainty. While a lender does not need to require a business to demonstrate the basis in its certification, the Small Business Administration may do so. The Small Business Administration said it would not pursue action against any such business that applied for a PPP loan prior to April 23 and repays the loan proceeds by May 7, later extended to May 14 and then extended again to May 18. On April 28, the guidance was extended to businesses owned by private companies with similar situations.

Several businesses, including Potbelly, Ruth's Hospitality Group, Shake Shack, Nathan's Famous, and the Los Angeles Lakers, decided to repay the loan proceeds. Chembio Diagnostics, a publicly traded company, received a $3million PPP loan that is said it would use to increase its capacity to provide infectious-disease tests, including COVID-19 tests, due to increased demand. On May 4, The New York Times reported that publicly traded companies had returned at least $375million in PPP loans, based on securities filings and public announcements.

Loans made to investment consulting firms 
Several of the largest investment consulting firms in the United States received large PPP loans despite questions as to whether the funds were needed. In June 2020, Reuters published an article detailing these practices, calling particular attention to the firm, RVK, Inc. The firm claimed to advise on more than $1 trillion in assets, yet it accepted a PPP loan of more than $2 million. According to Reuters, the firm’s President, James Voytko, “said in an e-mail that RVK had followed program guidelines and maintained staffing levels, though he declined to answer written questions about the extent to which the coronavirus pandemic had impacted the company’s finances.” He further confirmed that “almost all of RVK’s revenue comes from fixed annual retainer fees.” In other words, declines in the market value of client assets would have little effect on RVK’s revenue. It remains unclear whether the loan was necessary or whether it has been paid back.

Loans made to other entities
On April 28, Treasury Secretary Steven Mnuchin said that the Small Business Administration would do a "full review" of each PPP loan exceeding $2million. Treasury Secretary Steven Mnuchin warned that businesses would held be "criminally liable" if they receive a loan exceeding $2million and do not follow the rules.

On May 13, the Small Business Administration said that any business that, together with its affiliates, received a total of less than $2million of PPP loan proceeds will be assumed to have made the good-faith certification of need in good faith. If the Small Business Administration determines that a business "lacked an adequate basis" for certifying the necessity of the PPP loan, the Small Business Administration will request business repay the outstanding PPP loan balance, and the business will become ineligible for PPP loan forgiveness. If the business subsequently repays the loan, no further enforcement actions will be taken on the matter.

On May 5, the Small Business Administration said that PPP loans received by nonprofit organizations are not considered federal financial assistance, are not subject to audit requirements under Uniform Guidance, and need not be included in the organization's Schedule of Expenditures of Federal Awards.

At least one of the people involved in the 2021 United States Capitol attack received a PPP loan. Richard Barnett received a $9,300 PPP loan on April 14, 2020.

A 38-year-old man in Irvine, California, had falsely claimed to be operating four businesses and had received about $5 million which he allegedly used to buy luxury cars.

Oversight 
Acting Pentagon Inspector General Glenn Fine was named the chair of the committee that oversees how the PPP loans were administered as well as the rest of the funding from the CARES Act. On April 7, 2020, four days after PPP loans began to be made, President Donald Trump removed Fine as head of the committee.

Report from SBA Inspector General
Hannibal Ware, the Inspector General of the Small Business Administration, said that the Small Business Administration had set stricter rules than were stated in the law establishing the program, which is causing an "unintended burden" on businesses.

The Small Business Administration requires 75% of a PPP loan be used for payroll costs, which is a rule not found in the law. The Small Business Administration stated all PPP loans would have a maturity date of two years, while the law allowed for up to ten years. The Small Business Administration has also not complied with all of the requirements stated in the law. The law required the Small Business Administration to issue guidance to lenders about the loan deferment process, but it did not do so. The law required lenders to prioritize businesses in underserved and rural areas, but the Small Business Administration did not issue any such guidance to lenders. The law required the Small Business Administration to register each PPP loan using the Taxpayer Identification Number of each business within 15 days after each loan was made, but it did not do so.

A group of software and information technology companies has sued the Small Business Administration and the Department of the Treasury, alleging that the two agencies had improperly added restrictions to the program that were not present in the original law.

A lobbyist for the Independent Community Bankers of America has said that virtually all business owners have taken such a loan assuming it would be forgiven, but the rules are highly complex and all the rules have not yet been released for loans that have already been made. The American Bankers Association has urged the federal government to release the forgiveness rules urgently.

Report from Government Accountability Office
On June 25, 2020, the Government Accountability Office released its first bimonthly report of its oversight of the Paycheck Protection Program, as required by the Coronavirus Aid, Relief, and Economic Security Act.

The report showed that, while the Small Business Administration had worked quickly to implement the PPP, the urgency caused confusion throughout the implementation of the PPP. Examples of ongoing confusion regarding the PPP included questions about who was eligible to apply for a PPP loan, the release of many unclear interim rules, the frequent release of numerous incomplete answers to questions, and a lack of clarity about how PPP loan proceeds must be used in order to qualify for loan forgiveness. The confusion added to the economic stress that employees were already experiencing from the pandemic.

Some small businesses were concerned that a government agency would later cite them for certifying their need for the loan without good faith. Small businesses were also uncertain whether they would qualify for any loan forgiveness. These uncertainties caused many small businesses to decide to return their loan proceeds rather than face these possible consequences. As of May 31, 2020, businesses had returned more than 170,000 PPP loans, totaling approximately $38.5billion, largely resulting from many confusing statements and a lack of clarity and confusing information released by the Small Business Administration.

The report found that the PPP loan application process allowed small businesses to self-certify their needs and qualifications. Consequently, some applicants were able to exploit the program by illegitimately inflating their payroll costs to qualify for larger PPP loans, misrepresenting their number of employees to illegitimately appear eligible for a PPP loan, and certifying that the loan proceeds would be used for allowable costs while actually using the loan proceeds for personal uses.

The Government Accountability Office's report said that the Small Business Administration still had not explained how it would conduct the reviews of PPP loans that exceeded $2million each, nor had it explained how it would perform oversight of PPP loans that were smaller than that threshold.

Memo from Office of Management and Budget
On June 18, 2020, the Office of Management and Budget issued a memo regarding the interaction between PPP loans and federal awards. In the case of an organization that has received a federal award and has also received a PPP loan, the organization may use PPP loan proceeds to pay for payroll costs as long as it does not charge the same payroll costs to a federal award. Furthermore, the organization must utilize the PPP loan proceeds first in order to sustain its workforce, and the organization should take steps to preserve federal funds for restarting work on the federally funded project.

Loan necessity questionnaires
In late October 2020, the Small Business Administration created a nine-page loan necessity questionnaire for entities that received PPP loans of $2million or more. The questionnaires ask about the entity's quarterly revenue, its capital expenditures, its dividend payments, whether it paid $250,000 or more of annualized compensation to any employee during the 24-week covered period, and to what extent its operations were altered due to COVID-19. In the version for non-profit organizations, the questionnaire asks about the organization's endowments. Nonprofit schools will need to provide information about their revenue from tuition. Some of the responses require information that could only have been obtained after the entity had already certified its need for the loan on its PPP loan application.

As part of the PPP loan forgiveness process, the Small Business Administration will send the questionnaire to the lender of each entity that received a PPP loan of $2million or more. Within five business days, the lender must send the questionnaire to the applicable entity with a notification that Small Business Administration has undertaken a review of its PPP loan. After receiving the questionnaire from the lender, the entity has ten business days to complete and return the questionnaire to the lender.

The Small Business Administration said it would use the completed questionnaires to assess to what extent the entity was truthful in its good-faith certification in its loan application that the PPP loan was necessary for ongoing operations due to economic uncertainty. The Small Business Administration may determine an entity was ineligible for a PPP loan and may pursue repayment or other remedies if the entity does not complete and return the questionnaire.

The completed questionnaires are not necessarily exempt from the Freedom of Information Act. The questionnaires ask the entity to indicate which parts of the completed form contain confidential or proprietary information, which might possibly prevent public release of the information under FOIA Exemption 4, which states exempts "trade secrets" and matters that are "commercial or financial information obtained from a person" that are "privileged or confidential".

The Small Business Administration estimated that 42,000 for-profit entities and 10,000 non-profit organizations would receive questionnaires.

Fraud

The U.S. Department of Justice charged more than 500 people with illegally claiming PPP loans, collectively totaling hundreds of millions of dollars. One California couple submitted about 150 fraudulent applications to claim over $20 million intended for small businesses. After their conviction in June 2021, they were given ankle bracelets, but they cut them off and fled. They were sentenced to prison in absentia. They were captured in Montenegro in February 2022, and  extradited to the U.S. later that year.

A 2021 working paper by three finance professors at the University of Texas at Austin estimated that about 15% of the program's loans, representing $76 billion (about 1.8 million loans out of the total of about 11.8 million loans), had at least one indication of fraud. About 1.2 million loans (totaling $38 billion) had at least two indications of fraud. The study identified four primary and five secondary indications of a suspicious loan. The primary indicators were "non-registered businesses, multiple loans at a residential address, abnormally high implied compensation relative to industry by core-based statistical area (CBSA) averages, and large inconsistencies (as large as tenfold) between the jobs reported by borrowers on their PPP application and another contemporaneous government program application with a different incentive structure."  The secondary indicators were "discontinuities around the maximum PPP compensation level of $100,000, rounded loan amounts, overrepresentation of PPP loans relative to U.S. Census data on the number of business entities in a particular industry and county, clustering of loans with similar features within lender-county pairs, and criminal records for PPP borrowers." The study found that financial technology (fintech) companies were far more likely to make suspicious PPP loans; fintech companies made about 29% of total PPP loans, but accounted for 52.63% of suspicious loans, and "FinTech loans are highly suspicious at a rate of almost five times that for traditional lenders."

A December 2022 report from the US House Select Subcommittee on the Coronavirus Crisis cited fintech firms and small business lenders such as Blueacorn, Womply, Bluevine, and Kabbage as among those that failed to help prevent fraudulent loans, which Insider suggested may jeopardize participation in future programs. The article cited Bloomberg News reporting that estimated fintechs "handled only 15% of PPP loans overall but accounted for 75% of the fraudulent PPP loans investigated by the Justice Department."

Notes

References

External links
 
  that established the Paycheck Protection Program

Forms and instructions
 
 
 ,

Interim final rules

Procedural notice

Official FAQs
 
 
 
 
 

Acts of the 116th United States Congress
U.S. federal government response to the COVID-19 pandemic